The Orangeville Transit System provides local bus service to the Town of Orangeville in central Ontario, Canada. Approval was given by the town council, on April 28, 2008, that the current contract with First Student Canada (formerly Laidlaw) to operate and maintain the transit buses, should be extended for another year. The Public Works Department administers the contract and is responsible for other non-operational functions. Town of Orangeville transit buses are all fully accessible, although less accessible First Student buses sometimes substitute.

Fares
Cash fare is $2.00 for adults or $1.50 for seniors & students, with monthly passes costing $35.00 or $25.00 respectively. Children under 5 ride for free.

Beginning January 1, 2023 Orangeville will begin a two year free public transit pilot program.

Services
Buses operate hourly on Monday to Friday from 7:15 am to 6:15 pm, and on Saturday from 8:45 am to 5:45 pm. Routes converge at the transfer point on Fourth Street and all operate along Broadway through the downtown, past the town hall municipal offices and the Mill Street library branch.

GO Transit
GO Transit reached an agreement with Orangeville and the Orangeville Railway Development Corporation to construct a park & ride lot at the railway station with operation starting circa June 2008. During the week there were then six GO Bus trips in each direction. Orangeville Transit offered free connecting rides for GO Transit passengers holding a valid ticket or pass.
GO Park and Ride Coordinates:

See also

 Public transport in Canada

References

Transit agencies in Ontario
Transport in Orangeville, Ontario